is a Japanese professional shogi player ranked 5-dan.

Satō has developed the Extreme Rushing Silver (極限早繰り銀) opening.

Promotion history
The promotion history for Shimamoto is as follows:

 6-kyū: September 1994
 4-dan: October 1, 2008
 5-dan: January 16, 2015

References

Bibliography

 将棋世界 [Shōgi Sekai]. 2017 August. 極限早繰り銀戦法 [supplemental booklet]. マイナビ出版.
 佐藤, 慎一 [Shin'ichi Satō]. 2018. 極限早繰り銀. マイナビ出版.

External links
ShogiHub: Professional Player Info · Sato, Shinnichi [sic]

Blog: サトシンの将棋と私生活５０－５０日記
YouTube: shogi mynavi: 極限早繰り銀の歌

Japanese shogi players
Living people
Professional shogi players
People from Nerima
Professional shogi players from Tokyo
1982 births